Kerri Ann Pottharst OAM (born 25 June 1965) is an Australian former professional beach volleyball player and Olympic gold medallist.

Pottharst was born in Adelaide, South Australia, and currently resides in Sydney.
In addition to her previous volleyball commitments, Pottharst is an accomplished speaker, MC and presenter. She runs corporate team-building programs, and commentates Indoor and Beach Volleyball. She also founded "The Athlete Story" - a speaker training business.

Sporting career 

Pottharst began playing indoor volleyball in 1982 and by 1990 was recognised as one of the best volleyball players in Australia. A serious knee injury in 1992 forced her off the hard court and she began playing beach volleyball.

She partnered with Natalie Cook, and together they represented Australia at the Atlanta Olympics in 1996, winning a bronze medal—the very first time that beach volleyball had been an Olympic sport. In the same year, the pair won a silver medal at the world championships and came first in the World Tour Event in Japan.

Cook and Pottharst split for a few years afterwards, but they reunited in time for the Sydney Olympics. Before the games, they finished third in the World Tour Events in France and Portugal. At the Games themselves, the pair dominated the competition, taking out the gold medal. In the aftermath of their Olympic win, the pair were awarded the Order of Australia, Australia's highest honor. Cook and Pottharst were included in the Fédération Internationale de Volleyball's Team of the Decade.

After the 2000 Olympics, Pottharst retired, but she decided to come out of retirement and return to competition until she suffered a career-ending knee injury. According to worldwide beach volleyball statistics, Pottharst had never been outside of the top 10 and rarely outside of the top six in International Beach Volleyball events since 1994 until her final retirement in 2003.

Pottharst appeared on the Nine Network's TV reality show Celebrity Circus in 2005, in which she trained with stars of Australia's Silvers Circus.

References

External links
 
 
 
 
 

1965 births
Living people
Australian women's beach volleyball players
Olympic beach volleyball players of Australia
Olympic gold medalists for Australia
Olympic bronze medalists for Australia
Olympic medalists in beach volleyball
Beach volleyball players at the 1996 Summer Olympics
Beach volleyball players at the 2000 Summer Olympics
Beach volleyball players at the 2004 Summer Olympics
Recipients of the Medal of the Order of Australia
Australian people of German descent
Sportspeople from Adelaide
Medalists at the 2000 Summer Olympics
Medalists at the 1996 Summer Olympics
Sport Australia Hall of Fame inductees
20th-century Australian women